WEEU (830 AM) is a commercial station in Reading, Pennsylvania.  It has a news/talk radio format and is owned by Twilight Broadcasting, Inc.

WEEU is powered at 20,000 watts by day. Because AM 830 is a clear channel frequency reserved for Class A WCCO in Minneapolis, WEEU must reduce power to 6,000 watts at night to avoid interference.  It uses a six-tower array to create different directional signal patterns for daytime and nighttime.  During the day, WEEU's signal is aimed toward the northwest and the southeast from its transmitter  in Shartlesville, near Interstate 78.  During the evenings, WEEU's signal is directed toward the southeast, away from Minneapolis.

Programming
WEEU has local talk shows during the day, including “Mornings with Mike,” “Feedback,” and "Rush Hour Wrap."  A local news staff provides updates, with world and national news from ABC News Radio.  During weekday early mornings, mid-days, evenings and at night, WEEU carries syndicated conservative talk shows, including Dan Bongino, Rich Valdés America At Night, Red Eye Radio and America in the Morning.

WEEU airs local high school football and basketball games from area schools.  It's a part of the Philadelphia Eagles Radio Network broadcasting Eagles football games live. It's also a part of the Philadelphia Phillies Radio Network, broadcasting Phillies baseball games live.

History
On January 4, 1932, WEEU signed on the air on 830 kilocycles as a daytime-only station with 1,000 watts of power.  It was owned by Berks Broadcasting with studios at 533 Penn Street.

In 1941, WEEU's frequency was changed to 850 kHz as a result of North American Regional Broadcasting Agreement (NARBA).  In 1949, WEEU was granted fulltime authorization by the Federal Communications Commission (FCC) by adding a directional nighttime signal.  In 1999, WEEU moved back to 830 kHz with a more powerful 5,000 watts daytime and 6,000 watts nighttime signal from a new five-tower transmitter site just north of Interstate 78 in Shartlesville, Pennsylvania. In the early 2000s, WEEU added a sixth tower and upgraded its daytime signal to 20,000 watts, keeping its 6,000 watt nighttime power.

WEEU had been co-owned with the Reading Eagle daily newspaper.  As a result of the bankruptcy of the Reading Eagle Company and the May 2019 sale of most its assets to MediaNews Group, WEEU was put up for sale.  There were tentative plans to shut the station down at the completion of the sale of the newspaper, which was to take place before July 31, 2019. Any potential buyer would be allowed to use the station's transmission facilities for up to five years, if not sold by MediaNews Group beforehand.

In June 2019, Twilight Broadcasting agreed to purchase WEEU, allowing the station to remain on the air with most of its existing programming, though iHeartMedia station WRAW claimed programming from iHeart's Premiere Networks as the bankruptcy took effect.  A local marketing agreement (LMA) began on July 1, 2019, upon the completion of MediaNews Group's acquisition of The Reading Eagle.  The purchase was consummated on September 12, 2019, at a price of $88,500.   Programming was simulcast on co-owned WBYN 1160 AM in Lehighton, Pennsylvania until 2021.

References

External links

News and talk radio stations in the United States
EEU
Radio stations established in 1932
1932 establishments in Pennsylvania